Waljeers County is one of the 141 Cadastral divisions of New South Wales. It contains the town of Booligal.

The name Waljeers is derived from a local Aboriginal word of the Muthi Muthi tribe.

Lake Waljeers is one of largest lakes located north of the Lachlan River and the river crossing at Thellangering.

Parishes within this county
A full list of parishes found within this county; their current LGA and mapping coordinates to the approximate centre of each location is as follows:

References

Counties of New South Wales